Dylan Matthew Beavers (born August 11, 2001) is an American baseball outfielder who plays in the Baltimore Orioles organization. He played college baseball  for the California Golden Bears.

Amateur career
Beavers grew up in Paso Robles, California and attended Mission College Preparatory High School. He committed to play college baseball at California at the beginning of his junior year of high school. As a senior, Beavers batted .529 with 10 doubles, 6 triples, 12 home runs, and 36 RBIs with 46 runs scored and 25 stolen bases.

Beavers batted .250 with one home run through 12 games during his true freshman season before it was cut short due to the coronavirus pandemic. He was named first team All-Pacific-12 Conference after he batted .303 with 11 doubles, two triples, 18 home runs and 49 RBIs. After the 2021 season, he played collegiate summer baseball for the Cotuit Kettleers of the Cape Cod Baseball League. Beavers was also selected to play for the Team USA Collegiate National Baseball Team. He was named a preseason All-American by several outlets going into his junior season. Beavers repeated as a first team All-Pac-12 selection after batting .291 with 17 home runs and 50 RBIs.

Professional career
Beavers was selected with the 33rd overall pick by the Baltimore Orioles in the Competitive Balance Round A of the 2022 Major League Baseball draft. He signed with the Orioles on July 23, 2022, and received a $2.2 million signing bonus.

References

External links

California Golden Bears bio

2001 births
Living people
California Golden Bears baseball players
Cotuit Kettleers players
Baseball players from California
Baseball outfielders
Florida Complex League Orioles players
Delmarva Shorebirds players
Aberdeen IronBirds players